The women's nanquan / nangun all-around competition at the 2008 Beijing Wushu Tournament was held from August 21 to 22 at the Olympic Sports Center Gymnasium.

Schedule 
All times are Beijing Time (UTC+08:00)

Results 
The nandao event was judged without the degree of difficulty component while the nanquan event was judged with it.

References 

Women's_nanquan